Elspet Jean Gray, Baroness Rix (née Gray; 12 April 1929 – 18 February 2013) was a Scottish actress, who first became known for her partnership with her husband, Brian Rix, and later was cast in many television roles in the 1970s and 1980s. She played Lady Collingford in the television series Catweazle and Mrs. Palmer in the television series Solo, alongside Felicity Kendal.

Career
Gray had a long stage career, particularly known for her appearances in the Whitehall farces, the company being managed by her husband Brian Rix, which were originally performed at the Whitehall Theatre and later at the Garrick.

Gray appeared in many films and television programmes, her earliest being The Blind Goddess (1948). She had several roles in the 1970s including parts in Fawlty Towers, as the paediatrician wife of a psychiatrist baffled by Basil Fawlty’s behaviour, The Crezz, Catweazle, and in the 1980s with Doctor Who story Arc of Infinity and the World War Two drama Tenko. She appeared as the Queen in the BBC sitcom The Black Adder (1983), with Rowan Atkinson as her son in the title role, and as Mrs. Palmer in Solo (1981–82), another comedy, this time with Felicity Kendal in the lead as her daughter.

Gray continued her acting career until the late 1990s, appearing in Agatha Christie's Poirot, the films The Girl in a Swing (1988) and Four Weddings and a Funeral (1994), and as Hilary in the British television comedy Dinnerladies.

Personal life and death
Gray married Brian Rix in 1949. The couple had four children – two sons and two daughters. Their eldest child, daughter Shelley (born 1951) had Down syndrome. The experience of caring for her led the couple to become active campaigners for the disabled. Rix later became Mencap chairman and president. He became a life peer in 1992. Shelley died in July 2005, aged 53.

Their younger daughter Louisa (born 1955) was formerly an actress, and is now an interior designer. Their elder son Jamie (born 1959) is a children's author who has produced television programmes such as My Hero. Their younger son Jonathan (born 1960) is Professor of Participation and Learning Support at the Open University.

Gray served on the Council of the Actors' Charitable Trust for many years, particularly giving her time to the management committee of the actors' care home, Denville Hall.

Gray died in hospital on 18 February 2013, aged 83.

Filmography

References

External links

1929 births
2013 deaths
Rix
People from Inverness
Scottish film actresses
Scottish television actresses
Spouses of life peers
Alumni of RADA